Vireolanius is a genus of bird in the family Vireonidae.

Species
It contains the following species:

 
Bird genera
Taxa named by Charles Lucien Bonaparte
Taxonomy articles created by Polbot